Jaspal Rana (born 28 June 1976) is an Indian shooter. He contested mainly in the 25 m Centre Fire Pistol category. He was a gold medallist at the 1994 Asian Games, 1998 Commonwealth Games - Men's Center Fire Pistol, Men's Center Fire Pistol Pairs, 2002 Commonwealth Games - Men's 25m Center Fire Pistol, 2006 Commonwealth Games - Men's 25m Center Fire Pistol Pairs, and 2006 Asian Games. At present, Rana coaches at the Jaspal Rana Institute of Education and Technology in Dehradun.

Career

At the age of 12, Jaspal Rana made his first accomplishment at his national debut winning a silver at the 31st National Shooting Championship held at Ahmedabad in 1988. His astounding performance earned him huge accolades and appreciation at his very first win. He grabbed his first grand international glory at the 46th World Shooting Championship (Junior Section) with a world record score in Milan, Italy in the year 1994.
At the 2006 Asian Games in Doha, he equaled the world record in 25 m Center Fire Pistol with 590 points (he had made this score twice previously; in 1995 in Coimbatore, and 1997 in Bangalore in the national competitions).  His other significant achievements include gold medals in 1998 Commonwealth Games - Men's Center Fire Pistol, Men's Center Fire Pistol Pairs, 2002 Commonwealth Games - Men's 25m Center Fire Pistol and 2006 Commonwealth Games in Men's 25m Centre Fire Pistols with Samaresh Jung. 
The Indian Olympic Association sparked controversy when it announced that Rana would receive the 'Best Sportsperson' award at the Asian Games, but instead, Korea's Park Tae-Hwan received the honor. Rana took this entire incident very gracefully, ignoring the entire goof-up.

Major achievements 
 Gold Medal in the 1994 Asian Games in Hiroshima
 Gold medal in Men's 25m Centre Fire Pistol (Pairs) with Samaresh Jung at the 2006 Commonwealth Games
 Gold Medals in 25m Standard Pistol and 25m Center Fire Pistol at the 2006 Asian Games on 7-8 Dec 2006
 While winning the 25 m Center Fire Pistol event, Rana equalled the world record by aggregating 590 points.*

Awards and recognition 
In 1994, he was awarded Arjuna Award, the second-highest award for achievement in sport, by the Indian government at an age of eighteen, by twenty-one he became Padma Shri and in between he was awarded National Citizen award by none other than Mother Teresa, other awards of national fame also came his way like windfall.

Political career 
Shortly after the Asian Games, Rana entered into the realm of politics. He was then a member of the ruling party, Bhartiya Janta Party and contested in Lok Sabha elections from Tehri. In the 2009 Lok Sabha Elections, he lost to Vijay Bahuguna of Congress. Later in the year 2012, he joined INC and is presently an active member of the party in Uttarakhand.

Personal life 

His father, Narayan Singh Rana is a politician and his coach. He has two siblings Sushma Singh (Rana), who is also the daughter-in-law of Rajnath Singh, an eminent BJP leader and Subhash Rana. Both his siblings are also accomplished shooters.

He is married to Aarushie Verma, an environmentalist, interior designer and national level shooter in pistol & shotgun.

References

Rana equals world record at Asiad, wins gold.
Exclusive Interview of Jaspal Rana after his 3 Gold haul in Doha, Qatar Games.

External links
 http://www.issf-sports.org/shooters/shooter.ashx?personissfid=SHINDM2806197601 Jaspal Rana profile} at ISSF
 
Jaspal Rana Institute of Education and Technology

Indian male sport shooters
ISSF pistol shooters
Shooters at the 2006 Commonwealth Games
Commonwealth Games gold medallists for India
Sport shooters from Uttarakhand
People from Uttarkashi
Living people
1976 births
Recipients of the Arjuna Award
Asian Games gold medalists for India
Delhi University alumni
Bharatiya Janata Party politicians from Uttarakhand
Asian Games medalists in shooting
Shooters at the 1994 Asian Games
Shooters at the 1998 Asian Games
Shooters at the 2002 Asian Games
Shooters at the 2006 Asian Games
Asian Games silver medalists for India
Asian Games bronze medalists for India
Commonwealth Games medallists in shooting
Recipients of the Padma Shri in sports
Medalists at the 1994 Asian Games
Medalists at the 1998 Asian Games
Medalists at the 2006 Asian Games
Shooters at the 1996 Summer Olympics
Olympic shooters of India
Recipients of the Dronacharya Award
Medallists at the 2006 Commonwealth Games